The Problem of Slavery in Western Culture is a nonfiction book written by David Brion Davis, originally published by Cornell University Press in 1966, then republished in 1988 by Oxford University Press. The book won the Pulitzer Prize for General Non-Fiction in 1967.

References

External links
New York Times book review
Wall Street Journal book review

1966 non-fiction books
Cornell University Press books
Non-fiction books about slavery
Pulitzer Prize for General Non-Fiction-winning works